Christopher Gerard Brady (born September 15, 1995) is a Puerto Rican-American basketball player for Cariduros de Fajardo of the  Baloncesto Superior Nacional (BSN). He played college basketball for the Monmouth Hawks men's basketball team.

High school career
Brady attended Harborfields High School. While in high school, he averaged 5.5 points, 7.9 rebounds, 4.6 blocks and 1.6 assists per game and he led Harborfields to a New York State Class A Championship, Suffolk County Championship and Long Island Championship in 2012. They were also New York state federation finalists while he was there.

College career
Brady joined the Monmouth Hawks men's basketball in the 2013–14 season, In his freshman season, he averaged 3.1 points, 2.9 rebounds and 0.3 assists per game. In his sophomore year, he averaged 4 points, 3 rebounds and 0.2 assists per game. In his junior year, he averaged 6.6 points, 5.9 rebounds and 0.3 assists per game. In his senior year, he averaged 9 points, 6.5 rebounds and 0.4 assists per game.

Professional career
In 2017, he started his professional career with the White Wings Hanau in Germany, where  he averaged 9.76 points, 4.88 rebounds and 0.97 assists per game. In 2018, he moved to the Atléticos de San Germán in Puerto Rico where he averaged 3.1 points, 2.79 rebounds and 0.38 assists per game. He moved to the Santeros de Aguada in December 2019. Brady averaged 9.3 points, 3.8 rebounds and 1.3 assists per game. On September 11, 2020, Brady signed with the Yamagata Wyverns of the B.League.

In 2021, Brady signed with Cariduros de Fajardo of the Baloncesto Superior Nacional (BSN) in Puerto Rico, for the 2021–2022 season.

In November 2022, Brady joined Kenyan champions KPA for the 2023 BAL qualification.

National team career
Brady represented the Puerto Rican Basketball National team at the 2019 FIBA Basketball World Cup where he averaged 0.7 points and 1.4 rebounds.

References 

1995 births
Living people
American expatriate basketball people in Germany
Atléticos de San Germán players
Basketball players from New York (state)
Centers (basketball)
Monmouth Hawks men's basketball players
People from Greenlawn, New York
Puerto Rican men's basketball players
Santeros de Aguada basketball players